Haret Jandal is a municipality in the Chouf District of Lebanon. It is 850 meters above sea level. Its inhabitants are predominantly Druze.

References

Populated places in Chouf District
Druze communities in Lebanon